Elegia equisetacea, the horsetail restio or broom reed, is a species of reedlike flowering plant in the family Restionaceae, native to the southwestern Cape Provinces of South Africa. It has gained the Royal Horticultural Society's Award of Garden Merit as an ornamental.

References

equisetacea
Endemic flora of South Africa
Flora of the Cape Provinces
Plants described in 1885